The 2008–09 Calgary Flames season was the 29th season for the Calgary Flames, and the 37th for the Flames franchise in the National Hockey League (NHL). The Flames finished second in the Northwest Division, and qualified for the 2009 Stanley Cup Playoffs as the fifth seed in the Western Conference, their fifth consecutive appearance in the post season.  Their season ended when they were defeated by the Chicago Blackhawks in the Western Conference quarter-finals.

The year began with the 2008 NHL Entry Draft, which saw the Flames select forward Greg Nemisz with their first round selection.  The Flames made several trades during the draft, acquiring forward Mike Cammalleri from the Los Angeles Kings as part of a three-way trade that saw Calgary deal the 17th overall pick to the Anaheim Ducks.  They then sent Alex Tanguay to the Montreal Canadiens in exchange for the 25th overall pick, with each team adding lower round picks to the deal. The Flames signed forward Todd Bertuzzi during the off-season, a move that generated controversy amongst a fan base with which he had been previously unpopular. Calgary was also active at the trade deadline, making three deals, including a significant trade to add Olli Jokinen from the Phoenix Coyotes.

Jarome Iginla surpassed Theoren Fleury's franchise record of 830 points during the season, scoring his 831st point on the same night he recorded his 400th goal against the Tampa Bay Lightning as part of his second career five-point game.  Iginla also scored his 400th career assist during the season, and scored his first all-star goal in his fifth appearance at the 2009 All-Star Game in Montreal.  Eight players made their NHL debuts with the Flames in 2008–09.

Regular season
The Flames began the season with five games against divisional opposition.  Despite holding leads in four of those games, Calgary won only one game, lost three in regulation, and a fourth in overtime.  Goaltender Miikka Kiprusoff became the focus of the team's early struggles, as his play was argued to be a major cause of the Flames' inability to hold a lead. Calgary rebounded with a six-game winning streak, during which Kiprusoff allowed only nine goals on 152 shots.  The team again struggled to win games at the start of November, losing five games in seven, including a pair of 6–1 losses to the Chicago Blackhawks and San Jose Sharks that led head coach Mike Keenan to cancel a planned mini-vacation for the players.  The cancellation appeared to be a turning point in the season, as the Flames recorded a mark of 15–4–3 following the loss, including a dominating 5–2 victory over the Sharks at home.  The Flames again beat the Sharks, 3–2 in San Jose, on January 15, to end the Sharks streak of 31 games without a home loss in regulation.

Rookie Brett Sutter became the 8th member of the Sutter family to play in the NHL on December 23 when he made his debut against the Anaheim Ducks.  The son of general manager Darryl Sutter, Brett scored a goal in his first game to help the Flames enter the Christmas break with a one-point lead on the Vancouver Canucks in the Northwest Division. Calgary expanded on that lead to five points after both Jarome Iginla and Mike Cammalleri posted career-high five-point nights in a 6–4 win over the Edmonton Oilers on New Year's Eve.

The Flames lost one of their original owners early in the new year as Daryl "Doc" Seaman died January 11, 2009.  Seaman had been one of the original group of six owners who brought the team to Calgary in 1980 and remained with the ownership group until his death.

Iginla reached numerous personal milestones throughout the season.  He recorded his 400th career assist in an early season game against Colorado.  He represented the Flames at the 2009 All-Star Game, his fifth appearance, and recorded his first All-Star goal.    On March 1, Iginla surpassed Theoren Fleury's franchise record of 830 career points as part of another five-point night against Tampa Bay, a game where he also scored his 400th career goal.

Injuries became a serious concern for the Flames entering March, as Mark Giordano (shoulder surgery), Rene Bourque (high ankle sprain), Todd Bertuzzi (knee surgery), Brandon Prust (concussion) and Daymond Langkow (hand) were all on injured reserve to start the month.  Looking to improve the team, Sutter completed two significant deals at the March 4 trade deadline, acquiring defenceman Jordan Leopold from the Colorado Avalanche and centre Olli Jokinen from the Phoenix Coyotes.  The deals paid immediate dividends, as Jokinen scored twice and Leopold once in a 5–1 victory the next night against the Philadelphia Flyers allowing the Northwest Division leading Flames to move ten points ahead of the second place Canucks.

The Tim Hortons Brier took over the Saddledome in early March, forcing the Flames on a season long, seven-game road trip, during which the team struggled to a 3–4 record that saw them suffer lopsided losses to the Carolina Hurricanes, Atlanta Thrashers and Toronto Maple Leafs; the Flames surrendered 27 goals in the final five games of the trip.  Consequently, the Flames saw their lead for the division shrink to five points barely a week after the victory in Philadelphia.  Calgary's lead fell to one point following consecutive shutout losses to the Pittsburgh Penguins and Columbus Blue Jackets in late March.  The Flames and Canucks ended the season in a battle for top spot, as both teams repeatedly took over the division lead heading into the final week of play.

Injuries continued to batter the Flames towards the end of the regular season, as defencemen Robyn Regehr (MCL) and Cory Sarich (broken foot) were both lost in early April. The injuries led the Flames to call up rookies Matt Pelech and John Negrin, the latter of whom had just finished his junior season and had never played a professional game, to make their NHL debuts against the Minnesota Wild.  The Flames were forced to play their final games of the regular season with as few as 15 skaters, below the normal 18, as the team lacked available salary cap space to call up replacements without sending other players down to their minor league affiliate in Quad City.

Calgary's late season collapse ended with Vancouver winning the Northwest Division in the final weekend of the regular season following consecutive victories by the Canucks over the Flames, Los Angeles Kings and Colorado Avalanche while the Flames lost against Vancouver and Edmonton.  As a result, the Flames finished the regular season second in the Northwest Division, and fifth in the Western Conference.

The Flames finished the regular season having allowed the most shorthanded goals in the League, with 15.

Divisional standings

Conference standings

Schedule and results

Playoffs

The Flames qualified for the 2009 Stanley Cup Playoffs as the fifth seed in the Western Conference, and faced the fourth seeded Chicago Blackhawks in the first round. The two teams met four times in the regular season, all of which resulted in Chicago victories.  It was the fourth time the two teams met in the playoffs. Calgary defeated Chicago in 1981 and 1989, while Chicago prevailed in 1996.

The Western Conference quarter-final series opened in Chicago; the first Blackhawk playoff games in seven years. The Flames dropped the first two games, each by identical 3–2 scores.  In both games, they played strong to start the games, earning 1–0 and 2–0 leads respectively before conceding the advantage. The Flames lost the first game after just 12 seconds of overtime.  An angry Flames team returned to Calgary for games three and four, promising to improve their play.  They won game three, 4–2, on the strength of Kiprusoff's 36-save performance in goal. The first three games of the series were physically intense and occasionally violent, prompting the league to warn both teams to tone down both the verbal attacks they were exchanging as well as to remain within the rules when engaging in scrums after the play ended.  TSN commentator Pierre McGuire, stationed between each team's benches, insisted that Iginla in particular had taken more verbal abuse than he had ever seen.  A "fired up" Iginla responded with two goals and an assist in game four as the Flames tied the series with a 6–4 victory.

Iginla and the Flames were unable to maintain their momentum when the series returned to Chicago for game five.  Iginla recorded only one shot, while Miikka Kiprusoff was pulled early in the second period as the Blackhawks easily won the game 5–1.  Forward Andre Roy missed the fifth game after being suspended and fined $2,500 after he initiated contact with Chicago's Aaron Johnson during the warm-up prior to game four.  The Flames' season came to an end in the sixth game as Nikolai Khabibulin's 43-save performance led the Hawks to a 4–1 win over the Flames.  It was the first time Chicago had won a playoff series since they last defeated the Flames in 1996.

The Flames revealed the true extent of their injury situation following the loss, noting that Dion Phaneuf, who missed game six, was playing with broken ribs, while Cory Sarich was playing on a fractured ankle.  With Rhett Warrener, Mark Giordano and Robyn Regehr all sidelined for the entire series, the Flames had five defencemen either out or playing hurt the entire series.  In addition, Craig Conroy, Rene Bourque and Daymond Langkow were all playing despite various ailments.  In spite of the Flames' injury situation, the team's fourth consecutive first round defeat led to new demands that head coach Mike Keenan be replaced as the team's head coach. Keenan was fired on May 22.

Player statistics

Skaters

Goaltenders

†Denotes player spent time with another team before joining Flames. Stats reflect time with the Flames only.
‡Traded mid-season
Bold/italics denotes franchise record

Awards and records

Several players made their NHL debuts with the Flames in 2008–09.  Adam Pardy began the season with the Flames, while Warren Peters, Brett Sutter, David Van der Gulik, Kris Chucko, John Negrin and Matt Pelech were each recalled from the Quad City Flames during the season.  The latter two made their debuts on the same night, April 3, after the Flames lost three defencemen in previous games.  2007 first round pick Mikael Backlund played one game with the Flames after leaving his Swedish team before being sent to the Kelowna Rockets of the Western Hockey League.

Records and milestones

Transactions

The Flames made two trades at the 2008 NHL Entry Draft, sending forward Alex Tanguay to Montreal and acquiring Mike Cammalleri from Los Angeles in two separate deals.  Calgary sent the 17th overall selection in the draft to the Kings, and received the 25th overall pick from the Canadiens as part of the trades.

Todd Bertuzzi was signed by the Flames as a free agent on July 8, 2009. The controversial forward best known for his attack on Steve Moore in 2003–04, had previously been extremely unpopular with Flames fans.  Bertuzzi, who had previously been booed by Calgary fans every time he touched the puck was greeted with loud cheers when he was introduced before the Flames' first exhibition game of the season.

The trade deadline on March 4 saw the Flames emerge as one of the most active teams on the day, completing three trades.  Calgary acquired defenceman Jordan Leopold from Colorado for Lawrence Nycholat, who was picked up on waivers from Vancouver one day prior and never played with Calgary, minor leaguer Ryan Wilson and a draft pick.  general manager Darryl Sutter then completed what was considered the biggest deal of the day, acquiring Olli Jokinen and a third round pick from the Coyotes in exchange for Matthew Lombardi, Brandon Prust and a first round pick.  The Flames then ended the day with a minor move, sending minor-league goaltender Kevin Lalande to Columbus for a fourth round pick.

Trades

Additions and subtractions

Draft picks

The Flames entered the 2008 NHL Entry Draft in Ottawa with the 17th overall selection. They dealt that pick to Los Angeles, and acquired the 25th overall selection from Montreal.  With that pick, the Flames selected centre Greg Nemisz from the Ontario Hockey League's Windsor Spitfires.  Listed at six-foot-three and 197 pounds, Nemisz is described as being a potential power forward who is not afraid of working hard.  Calgary drafted six other players, led by second-round selection Mitch Wahl, whom the Flames project to be a potential top-six forward.

Statistics are updated to the end of the 2014–15 NHL season. † denotes player was on an NHL roster in 2014–15.

Farm teams

Quad City Flames
The Quad City Flames entered their second season in the American Hockey League (AHL) in 2008–09.  The team was dogged throughout the season by rumours that the franchise would relocate to Abbotsford, British Columbia in 2009–10.  The owners in Quad Cities acknowledged that the Flames had been considering a change, but expected the franchise would remain in Moline, Illinois.  Despite these assurances, Calgary confirmed on March 11 that they had reached an agreement with the owners in Quad Cities to end their affiliation agreement after only two seasons, and announced their intent to move into Abbotsford.  The proposed relocation was approved by the AHL board of governors on April 29, 2009.

On the ice, Quad City finished with a 36–31–6–7 record, fifth in the West Division, and one point shy of making the playoffs.  Quad City played its final game on April 11, 2009 with a 5–3 win over the Iowa Chops.  Kyle Greentree led the team in scoring, with a franchise high 76 points.

Las Vegas Wranglers
The Las Vegas Wranglers remained Calgary's ECHL affiliate for the sixth season, where they finished 2nd in the Pacific division with a 34–31–2–6 record.  In the Kelly Cup playoffs, the Wranlgers defeated the Bakersfield Condors and Stockton Thunder in seven games each to reach the National Conference finals.  The season came to an end against the Alaska Aces, who eliminated Las Vegas in four games.

As part of their affiliation agreement with Las Vegas, the Flames assigned four players to the Wranglers to begin the season: Gord Baldwin, Hugo Carpentier, Kevin Lalande and Dan Spang. Lalande led the team amongst goaltenders with 21 games played, recording a record of 9–8–0–3, while Glen Fisher led the team with 11 wins.  Dan Riedel, acquired from the Dayton Bombers during the season led the team with 23 goals and 57 points.

References

 Player stats: 
 Game log: 
 Team standings: 

Calgary Flames seasons
Calgary Flames season, 2008-09
Cal